St Mary and St James Cathedral is an Anglican church in  Maseru. The current incumbent is The Very Rev Job Mofana.

References 

Anglican cathedrals in Africa
Buildings and structures in Maseru
Cathedrals in Lesotho